Edward D'Arcy McCrea (7 February 1896 – 22 December 1940) was an Irish tennis player. He competed in the mixed doubles, men's singles and men's double at the 1924 Summer Olympics. He died during the Second World War.

Personal life
McCrea studied at Trinity College, Dublin and graduated in 1920. Designated a Master of Surgery in 1922, he became a fellow of the Royal College of Surgeons in Ireland the same year. Settling in Manchester, he worked at Salford Royal Hospital and taught physiology at the University of Manchester.

McCrea died on 22 December 1940 in the midst of the Manchester Blitz. Whilst hosting a party at his home in Salford, a Luftwaffe parachute mine struck the house and exploded, killing all inside.

References

1896 births
1940 deaths
Tennis players from Dublin (city)
Olympic tennis players of Ireland
British civilians killed in World War II
Alumni of Trinity College Dublin
Fellows of the Royal College of Surgeons in Ireland
Academics of the University of Manchester
Tennis players at the 1924 Summer Olympics
20th-century surgeons
Irish male tennis players
Deaths by airstrike during World War II
Irish surgeons
Irish civilians killed in World War II